Freydun (from Middle Persian Frēdōn, Proto-Iranian Θraitauna-) is an Iranian mythical character.

Freydun, Fereydun, Faridun, or Afridun may refer to:

People
Fereydoon Mirza (1810–1855), the 5th son of Abbas Mirza, then crown prince of Persia
Freydun Atturaya (1891–1926), Assyrian physician
Fereydoon Batmanghelidj (1931–2004), Iranian medical doctor; best known for his book, Your Body's Many Cries for Water
Fereydoon Motamed (1917–1993), internationally known professor and linguist
Fereydun Adamiyat (1920–2008), Iranian historian
Fereydoon Hoveyda (1924–2006), influential Iranian diplomat, writer and thinker
Fereydoon Moshiri (1926–2000), contemporary Persian poet
Fereydoon Farrokhzad (1936–1992), Persian singer, actor, poet, TV and Radio host, writer, and political opposition figure
Fereydun Gole (1942–2005), Iranian screenwriter
Fereydoon Family (born 1945), leading Persian physicist in the field of nanotechnology and solid-state physics
Hassan Fereydun (born 1948), birth name of Hassan Rouhani, the 7th President of Iran
Fereydoon Davatchi, director of the Rheumatology Research Center (RRC) in the Tehran University of Medical sciences
Faridun Muhiddinov, Tajikistani engineer and politician
Fereydoon Fazli (born 1971), Iranian football player
Ferydoon Zandi (born 1979), Iranian football midfielder
Faredoon Irani, Indian cinematographer
Fardunjee Marzban (1787–1847), Indian newspaper founder
Jehangir Faredoon Ghandy, Indian engineer, father of Feroze Gandhi and father-in-law of Indira Gandhi

Places
Fereydun, Kerman, Iran
Fereydun, Kermanshah, Iran
Fereydun, Zanjan, Iran
Fereydoon Kenar, Iranian resort town on the Caspian Sea
Fereydoon Shahr, city in the western part of the Isfahan Province, Iran

See also
Freydun (given name)